Platylesches galesa, the white-tail hopper or black hopper, is a butterfly of the family Hesperiidae. It is found in Transvaal, Mozambique and Zimbabwe. It is common in forest and woodland.

The wingspan is 33–37 mm for males and 36–40 mm for females. Adults are dark brown. The forewings have small hyaline (glass-like) spots and the hindwings have a row of small yellowish discal spots. The abdomen has a white tip.

The larvae feed on Parinari species. Reports of other food plants, mainly grasses, are known to be erroneous. Third instar larvae are light green with black markings and a black head. The fourth instar is pale green with fine darker green mottling and a brown head. The fifth instar is salmon pink with a brown head. The larvae construct a shelter from a whole leaf of their host plant, folded over and closed by fine silk threads.

References

Butterflies described in 1877
Erionotini
Butterflies of Africa
Taxa named by William Chapman Hewitson